This article lists the official squads for the 2017 Women's Rugby World Cup in Ireland.

Pool A

Head Coach:  Francois Ratier

Head coach:  Jo Hull

Head coach:  Glenn Moore

Head coach:  Rowland Phillips

Pool B

Head coach:  Simon Middleton

Head coach:  Andrea Di Giandomenico

Head coach:  José Antonio Barrio

Head coach:  Pete Steinberg

Pool C

Head coach:  Paul Verrell

Head coach:  Samuel Cherouk

Head coach:  Tom Tierney

Head coach:  Goshi Arimizu

References

2017
squads